The Hatz CB-1 is a 1960s American light biplane designed by John Hatz for amateur construction. The Hatz Classic variant is supplied in kit form by Makelan Corp of New Braunfels, Texas, while the other variants are available as plans only.

Design and development
John Hatz designed the CB-1 in 1968 as a smaller version of a Waco F series biplane. The CB-1 is a tandem dual-control two-seat biplane with fixed tailwheel landing gear and powered by a variety of nose-mounted small engines. Steel tube fuselage and tail with wooden wings. Plans and kits of parts for the CB-1 are available for amateur construction.

Variants
CB-1
Base model
Hatz Classic
Designed by Billy Dawson, which has a stretched more rounded fuselage and powered by a Lycoming O-320.
Kelly-D
A simpler and larger variant of the Hatz, with the wing center section removed, designed by Dudley Kelly.
Hatz Bantam
A lighter model that fits the United States light-sport aircraft rules.

Specifications (CB-1)

See also

References

 
 
 Aerofiles

External links

 Official website - Hatz CB-1
 Official website - Hatz Classic kit supplier
 Official website - Hatz Bantam kit supplier

Makelan aircraft
1960s United States sport aircraft
Homebuilt aircraft
Biplanes
Single-engined tractor aircraft
Aircraft first flown in 1968